Radovci may refer to:

 Radovci, Grad, a village in the Municipality of Grad, Slovenia
 , a village in the municipality of Požega, Serbia